Elles & Lui (English: Them & Him) is 14th studio album by Alain Chamfort. It was digitally released in France on 7 May 2012, followed by physical CD release on 28 May 2012. The album celebrates the 40th anniversary of Chamfort's career, with every track on the album featuring a duet with a female vocalist.

Synopsis
"With nearly forty year career studded with elegant and refined compositions, Alain Chamfort is the undisputed leader of the French pop generation. He plotted, accompanied mainly by Serge Gainsbourg and Jacques Duvall of the words, the contours of a singular and timeless: Rendez-Vous au Paradis, Malaise en Malaisie, Manureva, L'ennemi dans la Glace, Bamboú, Traces de Toi, Mouse since it is serious, Clara veut la Lune, Palais Royal, and Les Beaux Yeux de Laure. A work in which seduction, compared to women, have always been paramount." 
(Mercury Records)

Track listing
"Manureva" with Audrey Marnay – 4:49
"Bamboú" with Camélia Jordana – 3:26
"Traces de Toi" with Fredrika Stahl – 3:54
"Malaise en Malaisie" with Vanessa Paradis – 4:38
"Souris Puisque C'Est Grave" with Inna Modja – 3:01
"L'Ennemi dans la Glace" with Elodie Frégé - 3:56
"Clara veut la Lune" with Alizée – 3:08
"Comme un Géant" with Kerenn Ann – 3:46
"La Fièvre dans le Sang" with Capucine – 3:48
"Les Beaux Yeux de Laure" with Claire Keim – 3:12
"Palais Royal" with Sarah Manesse and Marina d'Amico – 4:01
"Rendez-Vous au Paradis" with Jenifer – 4:06

Charts

Weekly charts

Year-end charts

References

2012 albums
Vocal duet albums
Fontana Records albums
Mercury Records albums